Duty Free is a British sitcom written by Eric Chappell and Jean Warr that aired on ITV from 1984 to 1986. It was made by Yorkshire Television.

Cast
Keith Barron as David Pearce
Gwen Taylor as Amy Pearce
Joanna Van Gyseghem as Linda Cochran
Neil Stacy as Robert Cochran
Carlos Douglas as Carlos the Waiter
Bunny May as  Hotel manager (series 1)
George Camiller as Hotel manager (series 2 and 3)
Ray Mort as George (series 1 and 2)
Hugo Bower as Zimmerman (series 1)
Joseph Fazal as Spanish Policeman (series 2)
Roger Sloman as Kev Wilson (series 2 episode Snap)

Plot
Duty Free is about two British couples, David and Amy Pearce and Robert and Linda Cochran, who meet while holidaying at the same Spanish hotel in Marbella and the interruptive affair conducted by David Pearce and Linda Cochran during their break. Another recurring character is the hotel waiter Carlos.

Although set in Spain, the show was recorded entirely in the Leeds Studios – only for the concluding Christmas special was the budget found to film some scenes in Spain at the Don Carlos Hotel and Spa.

Like many British sitcoms, there was a class-related tension between the two; with the Pearces working-class from Northampton, and the Cochrans a more affluent, middle-class couple from Henley-on-Thames in Oxfordshire. The character of David Pearce, much to his wife's chagrin, became uncomfortable with his own status and politics after meeting the Cochrans and tried to change his outlook.

Series 1 and 2 take place during the same two weeks long holiday, leading to the show famously being dubbed "the holiday that never ends".  The first episode of Series 3 takes place back in the UK, a year later, but subsequently the story returns to Spain.

The series was based on a one-off TV play by Chappell, We're Strangers Here,
first performed on TV with Geraldine McEwan and Ian Hendry as a two-hander and subsequently on stage as a four-hander at the Theatre Royal, Windsor.

Episodes

Series 1 (1984)

Series 2 (1984)

Series 3 (1986)

Christmas Special (1986)

Trivia
The actor Frazer Hines, known for his former role in Emmerdale Farm, and television presenter Judith Chalmers made guest appearances in the series, playing themselves. The former was a hotel guest who tried to seduce Amy Pearce; the latter was filming an episode of Wish You Were Here...? from the hotel and interviewed the two couples.

It set viewing records for a sitcom at the time, regularly topping the UK TV ratings, and was nominated for a BAFTA for Best Comedy Series in 1986 alongside Only Fools and Horses, Yes, Prime Minister, 'Allo 'Allo!, Ever Decreasing Circles, and lost out to the winner, Just Good Friends.

In May 2015, both Gwen Taylor and Keith Barron played a couple again in an episode of the daytime soap opera Doctors.

Last of the Duty Free - Play

Last of the Duty Free by Eric Chappell and Jean Warr is a theatrical sequel to the TV series. The scene is many years later in which, as before, deceptions, misunderstandings and preposterous situations abound. Gwen Taylor, Keith Barron and Neil Stacy returned to their previous roles when the play opened at The Royal Theatre, Windsor in April 2014.

On tour, the play's title was shortened to Duty Free.

References

External links
 Duty Free British TV Comedy
 
 

1980s British sitcoms
1984 British television series debuts
1986 British television series endings
English-language television shows
ITV sitcoms
Television series by Yorkshire Television
Television shows set in Spain
Television series by ITV Studios
Television series about vacationing